Frankenstein Jr. and The Impossibles is an American animated television series produced by Hanna-Barbera Productions. It premiered on September 10, 1966 on CBS, and ran for two seasons on Saturday mornings.

Overview
The program contained two segments, which each served as a middle ground between Hanna-Barbera's traditional early output and its superhero-based late-1960s cartoons. Each episode would feature two segments with The Impossibles, and Frankenstein Jr. in between.
 Frankenstein Jr.: Taking place in Civic City, boy scientist Buzz Conroy (voiced by Dick Beals) and his father Professor Conroy (voiced by John Stephenson) fight supervillains with the aid of a powerful heroic robot named "Frankenstein Jr." (voiced by Ted Cassidy).  Buzz built "Frankie" and activated him through an energy ring. Frankenstein Jr. appears to be reminscient of the anime character Tetsujin 28-go (also known as Gigantor).
 The Impossibles: The title characters are a trio of superheroes (Multi-Man, Fluid-Man, and Coil-Man) who pose undercover as a Beatlesesque rock music band. The characters' names are descriptive of their powers: Multi-Man (voiced by Don Messick) can create identical copies of himself; Coil-Man (voiced by Hal Smith) can form into a super-springy coil; and Fluid-Man (voiced by Paul Frees) can transform his body into any fluid. The heroes receive assignments from "Big D" (also voiced by Frees), who contacts them via a receiver in the base of Coil-Man's left-handed guitar. During the development of the show, this group was called "The Incredibles," but was changed to "The Impossibles" by the time of production. The team's pre-production name was later given to the superhero family from the 2004 Disney/Pixar film of the same name.

The show was the target of complaints about violence in children's television, and was canceled in 1968 (first-run episodes had already ceased a year earlier). The Frankenstein Jr. segments were later recycled in the 1976 series Space Ghost and Frankenstein Jr., which aired on NBC from November 27, 1976 to September 3, 1977, replacing the canceled Big John, Little John.

Voice cast
 Dick Beals as Buzz Conroy
 Ted Cassidy as Frankenstein Jr.
 John Stephenson as Professor Conroy
 Paul Frees as Fluid Man, Big D
 Don Messick as Multi Man
 Hal Smith as Coil Man

Episodes

Frankenstein Jr.

The Impossibles

Home media
On April 26, 2011, Warner Home Video (via the Warner Archive Collection) released Frankenstein Jr. and The Impossibles: The Complete Series on DVD in region 1 as part of their Hanna–Barbera Classics Collection. This is a Manufacture-on-Demand (MOD) release, available exclusively through Warner's online store and Amazon.com.

Other appearances
 Buzz Conroy and Frankenstein Jr. appeared in the Yogi's Space Race episode "Race Through the Planet of the Monsters".
 Frankenstein Jr. appeared in the Johnny Bravo episode "Johnny Makeover".
 Frankenstein Jr. appeared in the 2013 film Scooby-Doo! Mask of the Blue Falcon.
 Buzz Conroy and Frankenstein Jr. appear in the 2021 film Space Jam: A New Legacy. They are among the Warner Bros. 3000 Server-Verse inhabitants that watch the basketball game between the Tune Squad and the Goon Squad.

Adaptations

A single issue of a Frankenstein Jr. and The Impossibles comic was released by Gold Key Comics in 1966 as a tie-in to the TV series, and the contents were reprinted in The Impossibles Annual by Atlas Publishing & Distributing Co. Ltd, UK in 1968. The two Frankenstein Jr. comic stories were titled "The Image Invasion" and "Frankenstein Jr. Meets the Flea Man". A new text-based story, specially written for the annual, was "A Spook in his Wheel". The character reappeared in the comic Hanna-Barbera Presents #8 published by Archie Comics in 1996. The front cover featured Frankenstein Jr. battling the Impossibles in an homage to the front cover of the original Fantastic Four #1 by Marvel Comics.

A Big Little Book titled Frankenstein Jr.: The Menace of the Heartless Monster was published in 1968.

The Impossibles' heroic identities were re-used for a later Hanna-Barbera production, The Super Globetrotters (which also featured a similar concept—in this case, the famous Harlem Globetrotters as undercover superheroes):
 Nate Branch's heroic identity was alternately known as "Fluid Man" or "Liquid Man", with powers (and a flippered costume) similar to the Impossibles' Fluid-Man.
 "Twiggy" Sanders became "Spaghetti Man", with coiling and stretching abilities similar to Coil-Man.
 "Geese" Ausbie as "Multi Man" had virtually identical powers as his Impossibles counterpart and a similar costume.

In 2016, Buzz and Frankenstein Jr. and The Impossibles played a major role in the DC Comics series Future Quest, that also featured characters from various animated series produced by Hanna-Barbera such as Jonny Quest, Space Ghost, The Herculoids, Birdman and the Galaxy Trio and Moby Dick and Mighty Mightor. In this series, the team gained a new female member named Cobalt and the character of Big D is a woman named Deva Sumadi who's also Falcon-7.

See also
 List of works produced by Hanna-Barbera Productions
 List of Hanna-Barbera characters

References

External links
 Frankenstein Jr. at Don Markstein's Toonopedia. Archived from the original on July 30, 2016.
 
 Frankenstein Jr. at the Big Cartoon DataBase

CBS original programming
1960s American animated television series
1966 American television series debuts
1968 American television series endings
American children's animated action television series
American children's animated adventure television series
American children's animated horror television series
American children's animated science fiction television series
American children's animated superhero television series
Anime-influenced Western animated television series
English-language television shows
Hanna-Barbera superheroes
DC Comics superheroes
Works based on Frankenstein
Television series by Hanna-Barbera
Television series by Warner Bros. Television Studios
Animated television series about robots